Sven Niklas Heinecker (born 17 June 1984) known as, ragen70, is a German professional poker player from Hamburg, Germany who focuses on online draw and No Limit hold'em cash games.

Early life
Heinecker was born in Hamburg and attended Gymnasium Süderelbe. He later studied at the University of Marburg.

Poker career
Heinecker is an online cash game specialist. He was the biggest online cash game winner in 2013, amassing over $6,100,000 from players such as Gus Hansen and Phil Ivey. Antonio Esfandiari called Heinecker a "boss" and considered him a favorite against the top 200 poker players. In April 2014, Heinecker won $1,400,000 in three days.

Heinecker plays under the alias ragen70 on both Full Tilt Poker and PokerStars where he has earned over $7,600,000 and $2,100,000 respectively.

Heinecker also has had success in live tournaments. In 2013, he won the GuangDong Asia Millions No Limit Hold'em Main Event, earning him $4,456,885.

As of 2017, his live tournament winnings exceed $4,700,000.

References

External links
 Niklas Heinecker Hendon Mob profile

German poker players
Living people
1984 births